Soldier Creek is an unincorporated community and census-designated place in Todd County, South Dakota, United States. Its population was 205 as of the 2020 census. U.S. Route 18 passes through the community.

Geography

Demographics

References

Unincorporated communities in Todd County, South Dakota
Unincorporated communities in South Dakota
Census-designated places in Todd County, South Dakota
Census-designated places in South Dakota